A referendum on unfair competition was held in Switzerland on 29 October 1944. Voters were asked whether they approved of a new federal law on unfair competition. The proposal was approved by 52.9% of voters.

Background
The referendum was an optional referendum, which only a majority of the vote, as opposed to the mandatory referendums, which required a double majority; a majority of the popular vote and majority of the cantons.

Results

References

1944 referendums
1944 in Switzerland
Referendums in Switzerland